Desmiphora lenkoi is a species of beetle in the family Cerambycidae. It was described by Lane in 1959. It is known from Brazil. It feeds on the willow-leaf red quebracho.

References

Desmiphora
Beetles described in 1959